Robert Naylor may refer to:

 Robert Francis Brydges Naylor (1889–1971), British general
 Robert Naylor (actor) (born 1996), Canadian actor
 Sir Robert Naylor (hospital director), chief executive of University College London Hospitals NHS Foundation Trust
 Robert Naylor (walker) ( 1871), co-author with his brother of From John o' Groat's to Lands End
 Robert Naylor (priest) (died 1661), Dean of Lismore and later Dean of Limerick
 Robert W. Naylor (born 1944), American lawyer and politician